Grez may refer to:

People
 Benjamín Grez (born 1992), Chilean sailor
 Cristóbal Grez (born 1987), Chilean sailor
 José Matías Grez (1766–1840), Chilean politician, mayor of Rancagua between 1804 and 1805
 Vicente Grez (1847–1909), Chilean politician, journalist, and writer

Places
 Grez, Oise in France
 Grez-Doiceau in Belgium
 Grez-Neuville in France
 Le Grez in France
 Grez-en-Bouère in France
 Grez-sur-Loing in France
 Grez, Navarre in Spain